Petre Gigiu (born 18 September 1953) is a Romanian former football player and current manager.

Coaching career
Gigiu managed a number of clubs in his native Romania and abroad in Germany, Algeria, Saudi Arabia and Oman.

Churchill Brothers

2018–2019
In August 2018, Gigiu was appointed head coach of Churchill Brothers of the I-League in India. His first competitive game as head coach was on 28 October 2018 in their opening match against the reigning champions, Minerva Punjab. The matched ended in a 0–0 draw.

2021
In July 2021, Gigiu returned to Churchill Brothers as head coach for their upcoming 2021–22 season.

Statistics

Managerial statistics
.

References

1953 births
Living people
Footballers from Bucharest
Romanian football managers
Romanian expatriate football managers
ACS Foresta Suceava managers
CS Corvinul Hunedoara managers
FC Universitatea Cluj managers
FC Astra Giurgiu managers
Dhofar Club managers
Churchill Brothers FC Goa managers
Oman Professional League managers
I-League managers
US Chaouia managers
CA Bordj Bou Arréridj managers
CRB Aïn Fakroun managers
Ohod Club managers
Saudi First Division League managers
Romanian expatriate sportspeople in Algeria
Romanian expatriate sportspeople in Saudi Arabia
Romanian expatriate sportspeople in Oman
Romanian expatriate sportspeople in India
Expatriate football managers in Algeria
Expatriate football managers in Saudi Arabia
Expatriate football managers in Oman
Expatriate football managers in India